Malekshahi is a Kurdish tribe found in the borderlands between Iran and Iraq. The tribe speaks Southern Kurdish.

Geography 
The Malekshahi mainly live in the provinces of Ilam Province in Iran, and Diyala Governorate, Wasit Governorate and Baghdad Governorate in Iraq.

Major tribes of the Malekshahi tribal confederation 
The Malekshahi tribe is the biggest Kurdish tribe in Ilam province.

They may be divided into two groups, each containing several clans.

Malekshahi Chamzai Chamshgzak: 1- Khamis 2- Naghi (Nazar Bag) 3- Kazem Bag 4- Rossegah (Rostam Bag) 5- Khodadad 6- Malegah 7- shakar Bag 8- Hossein Bag 9- Bawah PirMohammad 10- Kharzeinvand 11- Gheytolli 12- Golan 13- Kalavand 14- Keynaineh 15- Khalil Vand 16- konarivand 17- Gravandi 18-Seyralvand 19- Shah Mir (ShyaraMir) 20- kol kol 21- kalega 22- Kawger (Kabkgir) 23- Seiagah 24- jomaa 25- Hamananahvakol  (Ali Nazar)

Malekshahi Gachi: 26- Rasoulvand 27- Bowleg 28- Kheirashah 29- kawki 30- Dou ghorsa 31- Gheytol 32- Kahalaf Mehr 33- Ghaterah Siah 34- Seyranah

References 

Kurdish tribes
Ilam Province